Grace Young (born 23 August 2002) is a field hockey player from Australia.

Personal life
Grace Young was born and raised in Grafton, New South Wales.

Career

Domestic league
In Hockey Australia's domestic league, the Sultana Bran Hockey One, Young is a member of the NSW Pride.

Under–18
Young made her junior international debut in 2018 at the Youth Olympic Games in Buenos Aires. She was a member of the Australian Hockey5s team that finished fifth.

Hockeyroos
In 2023, Young was named in the Hockeyroos squad for the first time. She will make her debut during season three of the FIH Pro League.

References

External links

2002 births
Living people
Australian female field hockey players
Female field hockey midfielders
People from Grafton, New South Wales